Robert Rayfield (1944-2021) known as Robbie Rayfield was a South African international lawn and indoor bowler.

He won the triples silver medal and fours bronze medal at the 1992 World Outdoor Bowls Championship in Worthing.

He won a gold medal in the fours at the 1994 Commonwealth Games in Victoria with Alan Lofthouse, Donald Piketh and Neil Burkett and four years later won a bronze medal in the fours at the 1998 Commonwealth Games in Kuala Lumpur with Burkett, Bruce Makkink and Mike Redshaw.

References

1944 births
2021 deaths
South African male bowls players
Bowls players at the 1994 Commonwealth Games
Commonwealth Games gold medallists for South Africa
Commonwealth Games medallists in lawn bowls
White South African people
Medallists at the 1994 Commonwealth Games
Medallists at the 1998 Commonwealth Games